Garinsky District is an administrative district (raion), one of the thirty in Sverdlovsk Oblast, Russia. As a municipal division, it is incorporated as Garinsky Urban Okrug. Its administrative center is the urban locality (a work settlement) of Gari. Population: 4,904 (2010 Census);  The population of Gari accounts for 50.4% of the district's total population. The main point of historical interest is the former town of Pelym.

References

Notes

Sources

Districts of Sverdlovsk Oblast

ru:Гаринский городской округ